Ğäbäşi Soltanäxmät Xäsänğata ulı a.k.a. Soltan Ğäbäşi (18911942) was a Tatar composer, musicologist and choirmaster.

He was born in the village of Keçe Solabaş near Döbyaz, then a part of Qazan Uyezd, Qazan Governorate, Russian Empire (now Biektaw District of Tatarstan).

In collaboration with Vasili Vinogradov and Ğäziz Älmöxämmädev he composed first Tatar operas, Saniä (1925) and Eşçe (The Worker) (1930), vocal and instrumental concertos, arrangement of folk songs. As musicologist, he is known by his articles, devoted to Tatar musical culture.

Soltan Ğäbäşi was a son of theologian and historian Xäsänğata Ğäbäşi.

References and notes

External links 

1891 births
1942 deaths
Tatar people of the Soviet Union
Tatar music
Soviet composers
Soviet musicologists
20th-century musicologists